Mee Loaybakee is a 2017 Maldivian romantic comedy film directed by Ali Shifau. Produced by Mohamed Ali and Aishath Fuad Thaufeeq under Dark Rain Entertainment, the film stars Mohamed Jumayyil and Mariyam Azza in pivotal roles. The film was released on 5 April 2017.

Plot
Ishan and Lamha are lovers, but had to part ways as Ishan left aboard fot further studies. After completing his studies Isham returns and announce his marriage with his new girlfriend Nashfa. Lam who still has feelings for Ishan is heartbroken but pretends to be happy for him.

One day Lam challenge Ishan to buy condom from the pharmacy as she knows the  pharmacist is Nash's brother Mumthaz. Lam tries her best to separate Nash and Ishan like fooling Nash into believing Ishan likes fish when actually he hates it. She even added laxative into a cake she made for ishan. But this plan fail as Sid ate the whole cake and suffers from piles. Later ishan lies to Mumthaz that the condom he brought was for Sid and Lam is Sid's wife. During the mahr ceremony, Sid flirts with his girlfriend liu and Mumthaz thought he is cheating on Lam. 

Day before Ishan's marriage Lam confess her feelings for Ishan leaving him in a dilemma. On the wedding day Nash encouraged Ishan to go after Lam which he does. While chasing Lam Ishan fall into the sea and Lam jumps in to save him. Ishan confess his love for Lam and the both hug each other in the water.

Cast 
 Mohamed Jumayyil as Ishan
 Mariyam Azza as Lamha / Lam
 Samahath Razi Mohamed as Nashfa / Nash
 Abdullah Shafiu Ibrahim as Sid
 Mariyam Sajiyath as Liu
 Ibrahim Amaan Hussain as GoGo
 Roanu Hassan Manik as Bodube
 Mohamed Manik as Adhil
 Abdulla Hussain as Kudey
 Ahmed Sunie as Mumthaz Shakir
 Mohamed Faisal as Imran
 Adam Rizwee as Ibrahim Shakir
 Ali Shazleem as Hassan Shakir
 Aminath Noora as Shazu
 Fathimath Sajina Shaheen as Asma
 Ahmed Naavil as Naail
 Ahmed Shakir as Maisan Shakir
 Maria Teresa Pagano as Dr. Teresa
 Aishath Gulfa as Dr. Aisha
 Abdul Fahthaah as Fatho
 Hamdhan Farooq as Shakir Usman
 Mohamed Waheed as Driver
 Abdulla Azaan as Receptionist
 Ismail Wajeeh as Ismail (special appearance)
 Yamin Rasheed as Yamin (special appearance)
 Zarifa Ahmed as Zarifa (special appearance)
 Ali Sulaiman as Ali Sulaiman (special appearance)
 Ahmed Yafiu as Yafiu (special appearance)
 Liam Adam as LJ (special appearance)
 Ali Farooq (special appearance) 
 Ali Firaq as Gang leader
 Ali Nadheeh as Gang member

Soundtrack

Accolades

References

2017 films
Maldivian romantic comedy films
Dark Rain Entertainment films
2017 romantic comedy films
Films directed by Ali Shifau
Dhivehi-language films